Beechwood may refer to:

Plants 
 Beechwood, the wood from any of ten species of beech trees
 Malay beechwood, tree Gmelina arborea, and its wood
 Willow beechwood Faurea saligna, and its wood

Places

Canada 
 Beechwood, Ontario

United Kingdom 
 Beechwood, Runcorn, Cheshire, England
 Beechwood, Merseyside, England 
Beechwood railway station
 Beechwood, Middlesbrough, North Yorkshire, England
 Beechwood, West Yorkshire, a location in England
 Beechwood, West Midlands, a location in England
 Beechwood, Highland, a location in Scotland
 Beechwood, Newport, Wales

United States 
 Beechwood, Indiana
 Beechwood, Michigan, in Ottawa County
 Beechwood, Iron County, Michigan
 Beechwood, Mississippi
 Beachwood, Ohio, formerly Beechwood
 Beechwood, Wood County, West Virginia
 Beechwood, Wyoming County, West Virginia
 Beechwood, Wisconsin

Buildings

United States 
 Beechwood (Astor mansion), Newport, Rhode Island
 Beechwood (Isaac Kinsey House), Washington Township, Indiana
 Beechwood (Southbridge, Massachusetts)
 Beechwood (Vanderlip mansion), Briarcliff Manor, New York
 Harewood and Beechwood, two historic homes in Middletown Township, Bucks County, Pennsylvania
 Beechwood (Beales, Virginia)
 Beechwood Hall, in Franklin, Tennessee

United Kingdom
 Beechwood House (disambiguation), several houses

Schools
 Beechwood School, in Slough, England
 Beechwood School, Royal Tunbridge Wells, England
 Beechwood Elementary School, in Pittsburgh, Pennsylvania, U.S. 
 Beechwood High School, in Fort Mitchell, Kentucky, U.S.

Other uses
 Beechwood children's home, in Mapperley, Nottinghamshire, England
 Beechwood Luas stop, in Dublin, Ireland

See also 

 Beachwood (disambiguation)
 Beechwood Park (disambiguation)
 Beechwood Cemetery (disambiguation)
 "Beechwood 4-5789", a 1962 song by The Marvelettes, covered by The Carpenters in 1982
 Beechwoods, a nature reserve near Cambridge, England